This is a list of hospitals in Bahrain. Hospitals in Bahrain can be classified into public hospitals (funded by the Ministry of Health or the Bahrain Defence Force) and private hospitals.

All hospitals are subject to inspection and accreditation by the National Health Regulatory Authority (NHRA), an independent regulatory body established in 2010.

Public hospitals
Salmaniya Medical Complex, Salmaniya.
Bahrain Royal Medical Services, Riffa.
King Hamad University Hospital, Busaiteen.

Private hospitals

Al-Amal Hospital, Hamad Town
Al-Hilal Hospital, Muharraq
Al-Kindi Specialised Hospital, Manama
Al-Salam Specialist Hospital, Riffa
American Mission Hospital, Manama
Awali Hospital, Awali
Bahrain Specialist Hospital, Juffair
Dar al Shifa Medical Centre, Hidd
Dar Al Hayat Medical Centre
Dr. Haifa Eye Hospital Hospital, Bu Ghazal
Dr. Tariq Saeed Hospital
Dr. Sulaiman Al-Habib Medical Center
German Orthopedic Hospital
Gulf Dental Specialty Hospital
Dr Wiam Clinic for Endocrine and Diabetes disorders
Gulf Diabetes Specialist Center
Ibn Al-Nafees Hospital 
International Medical City Hospital, Riffa
KIMS Bahrain Medical Centre
Middle East Hospitals & Medical Centers
Noor Specialist Hospital, Manama
Royal Hospital for Women and Children, Riffa
Royal Bahrain Hospital 
Shifa Al Jazeera
Urology & Plastic Surgery Hospital (UPS)
Alwalil Hospital Manama Bahrain
Dr. Abeer Cosmplastic Clinic - Zinj
Reval Medical Center - Isa Town

See also
Healthcare in Bahrain
Health in Bahrain
List of burn centres in Bahrain

References

Bahrain
 List
Hospitals
Bahrain